The Volkswagen Audi Group (VAG) AEB Engine is a line of mechanically-similar 1.8-liter, 20-valve, turbocharged, inline-four engines, designed, developed, and produced by the Volkswagen Group, and used in the various models, between 1993 and 2010.

References

AEB
Gasoline engines by model